Dawn Donuts is a doughnut chain begun in Jackson, Michigan. Although most of the chain was sold to Dunkin' Donuts in 1991, the bakery for the company's donuts remains operational, as do two locations in the Flint area.

History
Dawn Donuts was founded in Flint by franchise owner Arthur Hurand in 1958 with a store on Detroit Street in Flint, Michigan.

In 1985, the chain unveiled a new store prototype for use at locations inside convenience stores, primarily Amoco gas stations. At this time, the chain consisted of over 60 stores, and was owned by Arthur's son, Gary.

Dunkin' Donuts announced plans to buy the chain in 1991. Most of the locations were converted to Dunkin' Donuts, but that chain also sold the right to the Dawn Donuts name to Dawn Food Products, a Jackson bakery. They also allowed individual franchises to keep the Dawn Donuts name. At the time of the buyout, Dawn Donuts had 59 stores in the state, and all but eight were slated to convert to Dunkin' Donuts. 23 of the stores were owned by the Hurand family at the time. The conversion doubled Dunkin Donuts' presence in Michigan. Arthur Hurand died in 2012 at age 95.

One of the two remaining locations, on Clio Road in Flint, was rebuilt in 2013 as a new store combined with a Subway.

See also

 List of doughnut shops

References

Companies based in Genesee County, Michigan
1958 establishments in Michigan
Bakeries of the United States
Restaurants established in 1958
1991 mergers and acquisitions
Doughnut shops